The traditional Chinese lunisolar calendar divides a year into 24 solar terms (節氣). Xiǎoxuě is the 20th solar term. It begins when the Sun reaches the celestial longitude of 240° and ends when it reaches the longitude of 255°. It more often refers in particular to the day when the Sun is exactly at the celestial longitude of 240°. In the Gregorian calendar, it usually begins around 22 November and ends around 7 December.

Pentads

虹藏不見, 'Rainbows are concealed from view'. It was believed that rainbows were the results of yin and yang energy mixing; winter, being dominated by yin, would not present rainbows.
天氣上騰地氣下降, 'The Qi of the sky ascends, the qi of the earth descends'
閉塞而成冬, 'Closure and stasis create winter'. The end of mixing between sky and earth, yin and yang, leads to the dormancy of winter.

Date and time

External links 
 Gregory C. Eaves: Soseol (소설, 小雪), first day of snow, Korea.net, 17 Nov 2016.

20
Winter time